The following is a timeline of the history of the city of Reno, Nevada, United States.

19th century

 1868
 Reno founded; named after Union Army officer Jesse Lee Reno.
 Reno Crescent newspaper begins publication.
 1870 – Population: 1,035.
 1871 – Washoe County seat relocated to Reno from Washoe City.
 1872 – Virginia and Truckee Railroad in operation.
 1873
 Fire.
 Court House built.
 1874 – Nevada State Journal newspaper begins publication.
1874– University of Nevada founded
 1877 – Bridge rebuilt.
 1879 – Town incorporated.
 1882 – Nevada and Oregon Railroad begins operating.
 1885 – Riverside Hotel in business.
 1886 – Nevada State University relocated to Reno from Elko.
 1894 – 20th Century Club for women organized.
 1900 – Population: 4,500.

20th century

1900s–1940s

 1901 – Reno attains city status.
 1904
 Nevada Historical Society established.
 Carnegie Free Public Library opens.
 1905 – Virginia Street Bridge rebuilt.
 1907
 Reno Commercial Club incorporated.
 City Hall rebuilt.
 Richard Kirman, Sr. becomes mayor.
 University of Nevada's Mackay School of Mines established.
 1910
 July 4: Jeffries-Johnson boxing match held.
 Washoe County Courthouse and Bethel AME Church built.
 Population: 10,867.
 1911 – YMCA building dedicated.
 1913 – Divorce residence requirement: one year.
 1922 – Nevada Public Economy League headquartered in Reno.
 1923 – Edwin E. Roberts becomes mayor.
 1925 – Empire Theatre opens.
 1926 – Southern Pacific Railroad depot and Reno Arch built.
 1927
 Transcontinental Highway Exposition held; California Building constructed.
 Divorce residence requirement: three months.
 1928 – State Theatre opens.
 1929 – Hubbard Field (airfield) and Odd Fellows Building constructed.
 1930 – Population: 18,529.
 1931
 Gambling legalized.
 Divorce residence requirement: six weeks.
 Nevada Art Gallery founded.
 Washoe County Library building opens.
 El Cortez Hotel in business.
 Roman Catholic Diocese of Reno established.
 1933 – Reno Main Post Office built.
 1935 – Reno Little Theater founded.
 1936
 Southside School Annex built.
 Harold's Club founded.
 1937 – Harrah's Entertainment (bingo parlor) in business.
 1939 – First Church of Christ, Scientist built.
 1942 – Reno Army Air Base in operation.

1950s–1990s
 1953 – KZTV television and KNEV radio begin broadcasting.
 1957 – February 5: Gas explosion.
 1959 – Desert Research Institute established.
 1960
 Airport terminal built.
 Population: 51,470.
 1962 – Club Cal Neva casino in business.
 1964 – Reno Air Races begin.
 1966 – Downtown Library opens.
 1967 – Pioneer Center for the Performing Arts built.
 1969 – Reno Philharmonic Orchestra formed.
 1970 – Population: 72,863.
 1971 – Peppermill Reno in business.
 1972 – Atlantis Casino Resort in business.
 1973 – Eldorado Reno in business.
 1974 – Reno Chamber Orchestra established.
 1976 – Fitzgeralds Casino in business.
 1977 – National Reno Gay Rodeo active.
 1978 – Meadowood Mall, Circus Circus Casino, and MGM Grand Reno casino in business.
 1980 – Population: 100,756.
 1981 – Nevada School of Law at Old College founded.
 1982
 Balloon Race begins.
 Reno Pops Orchestra formed.
 1983
 Reno Gazette-Journal newspaper in publication.
 KNPB television and KRNV-FM radio begin broadcasting.
 1984 – University of Nevada's School of Journalism established.
 1985
 January 21: Airplane crash.
 University of Nevada, Reno Arboretum established.
 December 23: Judas Priest fans James Vance and Raymond Belknap shoot themselves in a suicide pact.
 1989 – Sierra Safari Zoo opens.
 1990 – Population: 133,850.
 1992
 Nevada Humanities Chautauqua established.
 Reno Air begins operating.
 1995
 National Bowling Stadium opens.
 Silver Legacy Reno in business.
 1997 – Great Basin Bird Observatory founded.
 1999
 Reno–Tahoe Open golf tournament begins.
 Artown nonprofit active.
 2000
 City website online (approximate date).
 Population: 180,480.

21st century

 2002 – Bob Cashell becomes mayor.
 2003 – Fictional Reno 911! television series begins national broadcast.
 2004
 Sierra Foundation established.
 Reno River Fest begins.
 2005 – Great Basin Community Food Co-op founded.
 2006
 March 14: Pine Middle School shooting.
 Battle Born Derby Demons (rollerderby league) established.
 2008 – April: 2008 Reno earthquakes.
 2010
 Stewie deemed world's longest domestic cat.
 Population: 225,221; metro 425,417.
 2011 – September 16: Reno Air Races crash.
 2014 – Hillary Schieve becomes mayor.

See also

 History of Reno
 National Register of Historic Places listings in Washoe County, Nevada
 Timeline of Las Vegas

References

Bibliography

Published in 19th century

Published in 20th century
 
 
 
 
 
 
  + Chronology

External links

 
 Items related to Reno, various dates (via Digital Public Library of America).

 
Timeline
Reno
Years in Nevada